Richard John Cusack (August 29, 1925 – June 2, 2003) was an American actor, filmmaker, and documentarist.

Personal life
Cusack was born in New York City, the son of Margaret Cusack (née McFeeley) and Dennis Joseph Cusack. His family was of Irish Catholic background. He served with the U.S. Army in the Philippines in World War II.  After the war Cusack attended College of the Holy Cross in Worcester, Massachusetts, where he played basketball with Bob Cousy and roomed with Philip F. Berrigan, the peace activist.

Cusack and his wife, Ann Paula "Nancy" (Carolan), had five children: Ann Cusack, Joan Cusack, Bill Cusack, John Cusack and Susie Cusack, all of whom followed him into the acting profession.  Circa 1963-1966, the Cusack family moved from New York City to Evanston, Illinois, where the five children grew up.

Career
Until 1970 Cusack worked as a Clio Award-winning advertising executive.

He then pursued a career as a film actor, beginning with minor roles.  Most of his acting roles were playing authority figures, such as a United States Senate Chairman, minister/chaplain, and U.S. Secretary of State; he played a judge in the TV movie Overexposed, and in theatrical releases Things Change and Eight Men Out.

Cusack was a documentary filmmaker. His 1971 abortion documentary The Committee won an Emmy Award. He also owned a film production company.

He was honored with an award from the Evanston Arts Council for preserving a school and converting it into the Noyes Cultural Arts Center, which houses the Piven Theatre Workshop where his famous acting children trained. Two weeks prior to his death, he completed the final draft of a play to memorialize his former college roommate entitled, Backoff Barkman, which was produced posthumously in the Midwest.

Death 
Dick Cusack died on June 2, 2003 in Evanston, Illinois, from pancreatic cancer, aged 77.

Filmography

Film

Television

Awards

References

External links
 
 

1925 births
2003 deaths
American male film actors
American Roman Catholics
American male screenwriters
United States Army personnel of World War II
College of the Holy Cross alumni
American people of Irish descent
Cusack family (United States)
Deaths from pancreatic cancer
Male actors from Evanston, Illinois
Male actors from New York City
Deaths from cancer in Illinois
Screenwriters from New York (state)
Screenwriters from Illinois
20th-century American male actors
20th-century American male writers
20th-century American writers
20th-century American screenwriters